Star of the Sea (Italian: Stella del mare) is a 1928 Italian silent drama film directed by Ubaldo Maria Del Colle.

Cast
 Maria Antonellini 
 La Cleo 
 Goffredo D'Andrea 
 Gemma De Ferrari 
 Ubaldo Maria Del Colle
 Gennarino Esposito 
 Giuseppe Gherardi 
 Gennaro Sebastiani

References

Bibliography 
 Scialò, Pasquale. La sceneggiata. Rappresentazioni di un genere popolare. Guida Editori, 2002.

External links 
 

1928 films
1928 drama films
Italian drama films
Italian silent feature films
1920s Italian-language films
Films directed by Ubaldo Maria Del Colle
Italian black-and-white films
Silent drama films
1920s Italian films